Later with Jools Holland is an official DVD released by Björk on August 23, 2003. The DVD contains seven performances by Björk from 1995 to 1997 recorded on the Later with Jools Holland program. All performances featured on the DVD are re-worked from the original album versions; for "Hyperballad" she is accompanied by electra strings; "Venus as a Boy" with Guy Sigsworth on harpsichord; "Possibly Maybe" with a full band featuring legendary slide guitarist BJ Cole; "Bachelorette" and "Hunter" with an Icelandic String Octet and Mark Bell, "Jóga" with an Icelandic String Octet and "So Broken" accompanied by world-famous Flamenco guitarist Raimundo Amador. Björk had also performed "Aeroplane" on the show with D'Influence (her first ever live performance as a solo artist) but it is not included on the DVD, although it is erroneously mentioned on the insert track listing. The performance of "Jóga" also appears on another Jools Holland DVD (Later With Jools Holland: Mellow), which was released in 2006. All the performances are of album tracks apart from "So Broken" which is a B-side to the Jóga single.

The Video Album was re-released in 2012 as Later with Jools Holland 1995–2011, including the latter performances from Björk in 2007 and 2011, promoting Volta and Biophilia respectively.

Track listing

References

Björk video albums
2003 video albums